Six Lessons from Madame La Zonga is a 1941 American comedy film directed by John Rawlins and starring Lupe Vélez.  The film was inspired by the same-name song interpreted by Helen O'Connell and Jimmy Dorsey Orchestra.

Plot
Aboard a luxury liner sailing for Cuba are a band of struggling musicians led by Steve Morrison along with a number of swindlers, one named Beheegan and another a pair of con artists passing themselves off as Señor and Rosita Alvarez, phony names.

Another passenger is Madame La Zonga, whose nightclub in Havana has been closed. She is looking for money to put the club back in business, but must avoid being fleeced by her shipmates and also must avoid the police, who are waiting for the boat at the dock. She disguises herself as a steward to disembark safely.

Alvarez attempts to have "Rosita" sing at the club, but eventually are arrested for their nefarious schemes. Madame La Zonga has a successful grand reopening, with Steve and his band the featured performers.

Cast
 Lupe Vélez as Madame La Zonga
 Leon Errol as Señor Alvarez / Mike Clancy
 William Frawley as Beheegan
 Helen Parrish as Rosita Alvarez
 Charles Lang as Steve Morrison
 Shemp Howard as Gabby
 Eddie Quillan as Skat
 Guinn "Big Boy" Williams as Alvin
 Danny Beck as Danny
 Frank Mitchell as Maxwell
 Johnny Bond as Pony (credited as John Bond)
 Richard Reinhart as Tex
 Jimmy Wakely as Jim
 Wade Boteler as Wade Boteler
 Eddie Acuff as Steward

References

Referred to in the 1941 Three Stooges short “I’ll Never Heil Again”.

External links
 

1941 films
Universal Pictures films
American comedy films
1941 comedy films
American black-and-white films
Films directed by John Rawlins
1940s American films